Iraq–Pakistan relations refer to the bilateral ties between the Republic of Iraq and the Islamic Republic of Pakistan. Cultural interaction and economic trade between Mesopotamia and the Indus Valley date back to 1800 BCE. In 1955, both Iraq and Pakistan joined the Baghdad Pact, a military alliance against the Soviet Union. However, when the king of Iraq was assassinated in 1958, Iraq pulled out of the Baghdad Pact, which was subsequently renamed to the Central Treaty Organization (CENTO). During the Ba'athist era, high levels of tension persisted between Iraq and Pakistan due to a number of conflicting interests between the two states, such as Iraq's support for Baloch rebel groups in Pakistan and Iran, Pakistan's support for Iran during the Iran–Iraq War, Pakistan's participation with the United States-led coalition against Iraq during the Gulf War, and Iraq's support for India against Pakistan with regards to the Kashmir conflict. However, following the 2003 invasion of Iraq that toppled the Ba'athist government, bilateral relations have stabilized; Pakistan has supported Iraq in its fight against the Islamic State and other militant groups active in the Iraqi conflict. Iraq maintains an embassy in Islamabad while Pakistan maintains an embassy in Baghdad.

History of foreign relations

Central Treaty Organization
Pakistan and Iraq joined the Central Treaty Organization (CENTO) in 1955 to oppose the Soviet Union; however, Iraq withdrew in 1959, following the 14 July Revolution.

Diplomatic rift and tensions
Relations between the two countries deteriorated during the 1970s, beginning with the 1971 Organization of Islamic Conference summit in Lahore. Iraq was the second country and first Arab country to recognise Bangladesh as a sovereign nation after East Germany in 1972. Iraq's then-President Hassan al-Bakr financially and militarily supported the Balochistan Liberation Army during the internal rebellion in Balochistan. The support continued till 1973 when the Military Intelligence of Pakistan convinced Akbar Bugti, a Baloch leader, to defect to Pakistan.

On 10 February 1973, the Punjab Rangers and the Islamabad Police raided the Iraqi embassy in Islamabad without warning the Iraqi government. This tactical operation revealed a large cache of arms, ammunition, and hand grenades. Other weapon supplies were found in crates marked "Foreign Ministry, Baghdad" and these were allegedly for the Pakistani Baloch rebels. Pakistan expelled and declared persona non grata for Iraqi Ambassador Hikmat Sulaiman and other consular staff.

In a letter written to President Richard Nixon on 14 February 1973, Pakistan's Prime Minister Zulfikar Ali Bhutto blamed India, Afghanistan, Iraq and the Soviet Union, for involvement in a "conspiracy ... [with] subversive and irredentist elements which seek to disrupt Pakistan's integrity."

A successful military operation led to dismantling of Baloch rebels in the province. In the 1980s, the Martial Law Administrator of Balochistan, General Rahimuddin Khan, enacted policies that stabilized the province. In the wake of the Iran–Iraq War, the Gulf Cooperation Council was formed in 1981 in the Middle East. During the war, President Saddam Hussein unsuccessfully tried to work with the Baloch rebels to divert Iran's focus to Pakistan. Most of the military instructors were from the Pakistan Armed Forces. Around 40,000 military personnel of Pakistan Armed Forces were stationed in Saudi Arabia to reinforce the internal and external security of the country.

The Iran-Iraq war was a polarizing issue in Pakistan, with half of its population now under threat from its own Shiite population and from Iran. President Zia increased Pakistan's security, knowing that since the country was close to the United States, it might get pulled into a war. The high-ranking members of Pakistan Armed Forces objected to the killing of Shiite pilgrims in Saudi Arabia. Zia did not issue any orders to Pakistan Armed Forces-Arab Contingent Forces, to engage any country militarily.

The Iran–Iraq war provided Zia with an opportunity to contend with Iran. Many stinger missiles shipped for Afghan Mujahideen were sold to Iran, which was a defining factor for the country in the Tanker war.

Gulf War and sanctions
In 1990, Iraq invaded Kuwait due to the increasing political tensions between the two Arab nations. Pakistan endorsed the United States-led military campaign against Iraq, with Chief of Army staff, General Aslam Beg and Chairman Joint Chiefs Admiral Iftikhar Sirohey overseeing the deployment of the Pakistan Armed Forces Middle East Contingent forces.

General Beg accused Western countries of encouraging Iraq to invade Kuwait, though he continued to lead his armed forces against Iraq in support of Saudi Arabia. As Iraq's war with Kuwait divided Pakistanis, Beg carefully commanded and deployed the Pakistan Armed Forces' contingent forces during the Operation Desert Storm.

After the 1991 Gulf War, Iraq began building closer relations with India. In 2000, then-Iraqi Vice-President Taha Yassin Ramadan visited India, and on 6 August 2002, President Saddam Hussein conveyed Iraq's "unwavering support" to India over the Kashmir dispute with Pakistan. India and Iraq established joint ministerial committees and trade delegations to promote extensive bilateral co-operation.

Normalization of relations
In 2003, before the outbreak of the second Gulf War, Pakistan announced that it was opposed to any military action against Iraq. Pakistan was under public pressure to vote against the war, although some had considered voting for the war. However, after the war ended, Pakistan indicated that it was willing to send its Middle East military contingent forces to Iraq for peacekeeping if they required it.

The United States and the United Kingdom made many calls for the deployment of the Pakistan military's contingent forces for peacekeeping operations in Iraq. However, the Pakistan military officials said "given the uprising against the US-led coalition forces in Iraq and the internal anarchy there, sending our troops at this time would be like jumping into fire." Tensions between the two countries remained intense over the issue of foreign hostages in Iraq. During 2004–05, 14 Pakistani citizens were made hostages out of which two were killed. However, the relations were normalized following the United States troops troop withdrawal from Iraq. In 2013, both countries signed a defence pact.

Iraq's ambassador to Pakistan Dr. Rushdi Al-Ani claimed that Iraq considers Pakistan "a Muslim super power" and that Iraq was willing to supply Pakistan with oil unconditionally. In 2014 Iraq purchased the Super Mushak trainer aircraft from Pakistan as part of improving defense relations between the two countries.

See also
 Indus-Mesopotamia relations

References

 
Pakistan
Bilateral relations of Pakistan